Danny Ray Kent (born 25 November 1993) is an English motorcycle racer, best known for winning the 2015 Moto3 World Championship.

During 2020 he competed in the British National Superstock 1000 Championship, aboard a Kawasaki ZX-10R, and for 2021 aboard a Suzuki GSX-R1000R in the British Superbike Championship, until a crash caused a dislocated and broken hip in August 2021.

For 2022, Kent continues with Buildbase Suzuki.

Career

Early career
Born in Chippenham, Wiltshire, Kent like many others started out in Minimoto, before moving into the FAB-Racing MiniGP50 and MiniGP70 British Championships. Kent progressed through the Aprilia Superteens Championship earning success before being selected for the Red Bull MotoGP Academy and racing in Spain in the Spanish 125GP Championship. When the Academy closed Kent was switched to the Red Bull MotoGP Rookies Cup, where he finished runner-up in 2010. Kent also contested a wild card ride at Silverstone in 2010 aboard a 125cc Honda, earning him a late ride with Lambretta in the 125cc Grand Prix world championship that year.

125cc/Moto3 World Championship

Kent entered the 125cc world championship with Lambretta in 2010 at the Japanese Grand Prix at Motegi, qualifying in 16th place, a big improvement on 29th in which he qualified for the British round earlier that year – however he retired from the race. He took a best qualifying position of 10th at the Portuguese Grand Prix in Estoril and a best and only race finish of 21st at Phillip island during the Australian Grand Prix.

For 2011, Kent switched to the Red Bull Ajo Aprilia team to compete in his first full season in the 125cc world championship. Kent enjoyed a successful first season scoring 82 points with a best finish of fourth place, on the way to 11th in the championship standings.

2012 was the start of the Moto3 class. The new formula would use four-stroke 250cc engines apposed to the two-stroke 125cc engines of the class it was replacing. Kent remained with the Red Bull Ajo team however the team switched to running KTM motorcycles spearheading the factory's assault on the title. The team had a fantastic year with Kent's teammate Sandro Cortese taking the world championship along with Kent himself taking fourth in the championship. Kent earned his first podium at Assen in the Dutch TT, and he took his first win at the Japanese Grand Prix at Twin Ring Motegi with a great last lap result. He followed up in similar fashion just four rounds later at the final Grand Prix of the season in Valencia with a brave last corner overtake on Cortese earning him his second Grand Prix victory.

Moto2 World Championship
For 2013, Kent raced with Tech 3 in the Moto2 category alongside fellow Moto3 graduate Louis Rossi. Kent's season started with a run to 18th place in Qatar, he scored his first points at round six with a 13th-place finish in Catalunya. Kent scored points on four more occasions with a best of 12th at both the Czech and Malaysian races, and had a strong end to season with three consecutive point-scoring finishes before breaking his collarbone in the warm-up for the Japanese Grand Prix, ruling him out for the rest of the season.

Return to Moto3

Having been originally announced to remain in Moto2 with Tech 3, Kent returned to Moto3 for 2014; he competed with the Ajo Motorsport team, riding a Husqvarna-branded KTM.

For 2015, Kent moved to the Leopard sponsored Kiefer Racing squad, running Hondas. Kent's season started off well, reaching the podium at the first race in Qatar and taking his first win for Leopard in the following race at the Circuit of the Americas. Kent won the next two races – the first British rider to win successive races in the lightweight class since Barry Sheene in  – in Argentina and at Jerez to open up a championship lead. He added further victories in Catalunya, the Sachsenring and his home event at Silverstone.

He led the championship by twenty-four points ahead of Miguel Oliveira, with one race remaining.

Return to Moto2
On 27 September 2015, it was announced that Kent would be moving up to the Moto2 class for the 2016 season, with his Leopard Racing team. He was joined in the team by his Moto3 championship rival Miguel Oliveira.

Kent walked out on his team after just three races into the season, and was without a ride for much of the remainder, with a wildcard ride in Moto3 and acting as an occasional replacement for injured riders in Moto2, before signing with a new team Speed Up Racing in Moto2 for the 2018 season.

Kent was sacked by Speed Up in late September 2018, with five races remaining, due to poor performances and refusing to follow team orders. In a statement to motogp.com, team boss Luca Boscaruro was highly critical of Kent, stating “that behaviour doesn’t work. I’m sorry, but not with me”.

British Superbike Championship

Kent secured an entry riding Halsall Racing's Suzuki GSX-R1000 for the Brands Hatch final round of the 2018 British Superbike Championship in October after a successful test. He failed to finish in two races, but finished in position 12 from 15 finishers in race three. The team subsequently folded after principal Martin Halsall withdrew funding.

In late May 2019, it was announced that Kent would ride in British Superbikes on an ex-Leon Camier 2016 MV Agusta F4, starting from the July event at Snetterton. Kent failed to finish a race at Snetterton, but achieved 18th place in BSB race 2 at Thruxton in August. His employment was terminated by his team in mid-August due to a court conviction.

Kent joined Buildbase Suzuki, continuing intor 2022. A practice crash at the Donington Park third-round in May 2022 caused hospitalisation with no participation in the races.

Personal life
Kent also became part of the Phil Burgan Race Academy (PBRA) – a programme for developing British talent in motorcycle sport, under the guidance of James Toseland. The aim of the programme is to provide support, both financial and consultative, to promising British motorcycle racers and teams of the future.

In August 2019 Kent received a four-month suspended prison sentence for carrying a knife in a public place during an altercation in March, 2019. This resulted in his superbike team  terminating his contract, with Gino Rea named as interim replacement.

Career statistics

Career highlights
 2001 – Welsh Minimoto – Debut and first win.
 2004 – FAB-Racing MiniGP50 British Championship (2nd Overall)
 2005 – FAB-Racing MiniGP70 British Championship (1st Overall)
 2007 – British Aprilia Superteens Championship.
 2008 – Invited into Red Bull MotoGP Academy and contested Spanish CEV 125GP (9th overall)
 2009 – Academy closed – transferred to the Red Bull MotoGP Rookies Cup (4th overall, 1 win)
 2010 – Red Bull MotoGP Rookies Cup (2nd overall, 2 wins)
 2015 – Moto3 World Champion (6 wins)

Red Bull MotoGP Rookies Cup

Races by year
(key) (Races in bold indicate pole position, races in italics indicate fastest lap)

Grand Prix motorcycle racing

By season

By class

Races by year
(key) (Races in bold indicate pole position; races in italics indicate fastest lap)

British Superbike Championship

By year

References

External links

 

1993 births
Living people
People from Chippenham
British motorcycle racers
English motorcycle racers
125cc World Championship riders
Moto3 World Championship riders
Moto2 World Championship riders
Moto3 World Riders' Champions